Preslav Getov (born 3 April 1965) is a former Bulgarian footballer who played as a forward.

Career

A tall and powerfully built forward, Getov made his first steps in football as a member of the youth ranks of CSKA Sofia. Between 1989 and 1990, he appeared in 14 Bulgarian league matches for their archrivals Levski Sofia, netting 4 times.

References

External links
 Playmakerstats.com

1965 births
Living people
Bulgarian footballers
Association football forwards
FC Dimitrovgrad players
FC Etar Veliko Tarnovo players
PFC Levski Sofia players
FC Yantra Gabrovo players
PFC Spartak Varna players
First Professional Football League (Bulgaria) players